Korea General Magnesia Clinker Industry Group is a mining and heavy industrial corporate group headquartered in Pyongyang, North Korea.  The company produces magnesia clinker, slightly burnt magnesia, chlorite, firebricks and fireproofing materials.   

The group imports some raw materials and some mining and industrial accessories.

In 2010, Vesuvius USA Corporation received a licence, from Office of Foreign Assets Control (OFAC), to import dead-burned magnesite into the United States from the Korea General Magnesia Clinker Industry Group.

See also
List of North Korean companies
Economy of North Korea

References

External links
DPRKOREA's Trade Directory site

Mining companies of North Korea
Companies based in Pyongyang